The Cold Springs School is a historic school building in a remote area of the Buffalo National River in southeastern Marion County, Arkansas. It is located at a place called Cold Springs Hollow that is now only accessible from the river. It is a small single-story fieldstone structure, built c. 1935 with funding from the Works Progress Administration. Construction of the school provided jobs to needy farmers in the area, as well as a place to educate their children.

The school was listed on the National Register of Historic Places in 1992.

See also
National Register of Historic Places listings in Marion County, Arkansas

References

School buildings on the National Register of Historic Places in Arkansas
National Register of Historic Places in Marion County, Arkansas
National Register of Historic Places in Buffalo National River
Schools in Marion County, Arkansas
1935 establishments in Arkansas
Works Progress Administration in Arkansas
School buildings completed in 1935